Barkey is a surname. 
Barkey is a variant spelling of the Swiss German Bürki; topographic name for someone who lived by a birch tree or birch grove and in some cases it may have been a topographic name for someone who lived by a stream as Birke also means ‘brook' or ‘stream’.

Barkey may refer to:
Barkeyville, Pennsylvania
Karen Barkey, professor of sociology at Columbia University